Athletics was one of the nine sports of the 2015 Commonwealth Youth Games. Held between 7 and 9 September, the events were staged at the Apia Park Sports Complex in Apia, Samoa.

Each Commonwealth Games Association was permitted to send up to two athletes per event and one team per each of the three relay events. The age of participating athletes was limited to 16- and 17-year-olds only. This meant that for 2015 athletes must have been born in 1998 or 1999 to be eligible to take part. Compared to the previous edition, the 2015 programme did not include the 2000 metres steeplechase, hammer throw, and triple jump disciplines. Two relay races were added to the programme, over distances of 4 × 200 m and 4 × 400 m.

The highlight of the first day was a run of 10.20 seconds by the winner of the boys' 100 metres, Tlotliso Leotlela. This was one hundredth slower than the world youth best for the event and the joint-second fastest ever run by a youth athlete.

Medal summary

Men

Women

Medal table

References

Results
Commonwealth Youth Games 2015 7/09/2015 - 9/09/2015. QLDAthletics. Retrieved on 2015-09-07.
Athletics. scyg-infoshare. Retrieved on 2015-09-07.

External links
Official website

Commonwealth Youth Games
Athletics
2015
2015 Commonwealth Youth Games